Sang-e Pir (also Romanized as Sang-e Pīr) is a village in Kuhpayeh Rural District Rural District, in the Central District of Bardaskan County, Razavi Khorasan Province, Iran. At the 2006 census, its population was 247, in 67 families.

References 

Populated places in Bardaskan County